is a Japanese singer, composer and poet.

Musical career
Yoshiko Sai was born in the south of Nara Prefecture in 1953. As a child she liked to draw, and eventually also became a keen reader. Although tests left little time for this hobby during high school, she recalls that she read some works by Edogawa Ranpo. In junior high school she entered the chorus club. Then in senior high school she and four other students started a band inspired by the popular folk group "Akai Tori" (赤い鳥), but she was more interested in painting at the time (she would later be personally responsible for the artwork of most of her albums). After failing to enter the Kyoto University of the Arts in 1972 she enrolled in the law department at Doshisha University instead, but spent the following year bed-ridden by a kidney disease. During her convalescence she read many books by famous authors, but most of all bizarre and dreamlike novels by authors like Mushitarō Oguri, Tachibana Sotoo, Yumeno Kyūsaku, Juran Hisao and Seishi Yokomizo. She recalled that "... perhaps it was because of my illness, but reading dark novels made me feel calm." The books would have a large influence on her later songwriting. After being discharged she began to write poems, and came up with the idea of turning them into songs so that many people could listen to them at once.

She became a professional musician after meeting Rabi Nakayama after a concert, who was convinced to let her record her first album.

Yoshiko's first album was produced by Yuji Ohno who would later become famous for writing the soundtrack of Lupin the III. Soon after recording her second album, she wrote movie soundtracks.

Soon after her fourth album was out, Yoshiko Sai retired from the music industry. She kept low-profile until the 2000s when several re-publishing of her music and poems, as well as new material, emerged in Japan.

Discography

Studio albums
Mangekyou (sometimes credited as Mangekyo, 萬花鏡) (1975)
Mikkō (密航) (1976)
Taiji no Yume (胎児の夢) (1977)
A Room with a Butterfly (蝶のすむ部屋) (1978)
Taklamakan (タクラマカン) (2008)
Yoshiko Sai Live 1976/79 (佐井好子 -ライブ) (2008)

Singles
When Turning 20 Years Old (二十才になれば) (1975)
Uninhabited Island (人のいない島) (1976)
Spring Dream (春の夢) (1977)
Blue Glass Ball (青いガラス玉) (2015)

Collaboration albums
Crimson Voyage (2001) (with Jojo Hiroshige)

Poems
Blue Glass Ball (1977)

References

External links
 
 

1953 births
20th-century Japanese women singers
20th-century Japanese singers
People from Nara Prefecture
Living people